Gloeomargarita lithophora is a cyanobacterium, and is the proposed sister of the endosymbiotic plastids in the eukaryote group Archaeplastida (glaucophytes, plants, green and red algae). Gloeomargarita'''s relative would have ended up in an ancestral archaeplastid through a singular endosymbiotic event some 1900-1400 million years ago, after which it was recruited by the euglenids and some members of the SAR supergroup.

The origin of plastids by endosymbiosis signifies the beginning of photosynthesis in eukaryotes, and as such their evolutionary relationship to Gloeomargarita lithophora, perhaps as a direct divergent, is of high importance to the evolutionary history of photosynthesis. Gloeomargarita appears to be related to a (basal) Synechococcus branch. A similar endosymbiotic event occurred about 500 million years ago, with another Synechococcus related bacteria appearing in Paulinella chromatophora.

 Description G. lithophora was first isolated in 2007 from microbiolate samples taken from alkaline Lake Alchichica (Mexico). These samples were maintained in a lab aquarium and G. lithophora was isolated from biofilm that occurred within the aquarium. G. lithophora are gram-negative, unicellular rods with oxygenic photoautotrophic metabolism and gliding motility. They contain chlorophyll a and phycocyanin and photosynthetic thylakoids located peripherally. Cells are 1.1 μm wide and 3.9 μm long on average. Growth occurred in both liquid and solid BG-11 growth media, as well as in alkaline water. Optimal growth temperature is 25 °C and optimal growth pH is 8–8.5.

 Bioremediation 
Some evidence suggests that Gloeomargarita lithophora'' could serve as a biological buffer to treat water contaminated with strontium, barium, or radioactive pollutants such as radium. This could be a useful application of bioremediation.

References

Cyanobacteria